"Bombers" is the second single by Tubeway Army, released in 1978.

Content

"Bombers" is considered by some to be one of the most popular songs by Tubeway Army, a Punk band popular in the 70s and 80s. The song enjoyed brief popularity in the 80s and is featured in several books cataloging iconic songs of the period.

The song is in a somewhat more conventional rock style than their punk-oriented debut, "That's Too Bad", and features sound effects simulating air raid sirens, dive bombers, and machine gun fire. Like its predecessor, the single earned indifferent reviews and failed to chart. It is one of the few recordings in his career which Numan did not produce himself.

The B-sides were "Blue Eyes", which harked back to the fast-paced punk style of "That's Too Bad", and "O.D. Receiver", a slower piece whose lyrics reflected a Burroughsian world of drug addiction.

All tracks on the original vinyl single were credited to 'Valerian', the name that Numan (born Gary Webb) had chosen for himself prior to Tubeway Army's début album; these would be his last releases using that nom de plume; henceforward he would call himself Gary Numan.

Critical reception

In his review for Record Mirror in October 1978, Robin Smith stated that "..the market for this sort of heavyweight monotony has died."

Reissue
"Bombers" was later released as a gatefold with the single "That's Too Bad".

Track listing
 "Bombers" (Valerian) – 3:52
 "Blue Eyes" (Valerian) – 1:43
 "O.D. Receiver" (Valerian) – 2:37

Production credits
Producers:
 Kenny Denton
Musicians:
 Gary Numan: Vocals, Guitar
 Paul Gardiner: Bass guitar
 Barry Benn: Drums
 Sean Burke: Guitar

Versions

Six recordings of "Bombers" have been released:
The original demo version, recorded 7–9 March 1978 at Spaceward Studios, near Cambridge. This recording was not released to the public until October 1984, on an album of previously unissued tracks from the same sessions called The Plan. These sessions featured Gary Numan, Paul Gardiner, and Numan's uncle Jess Lidyard on drums.
The single version recorded on 15 April 1978 and released in July the same year. This session was produced by Kenny Denton, and featured a short-lived band line-up of Numan, Gardiner, Barry Benn, and Sean Burke. It has since appeared on CD reissues of The Plan. The single features a slightly revised lyric: on the demo, the third verse starts with "All the junkies pulling needles from their arms." Beggars Banquet feared that the word "junkies" would prevent the song receiving airplay and so, for the single, Numan changed the line to "All the nurses pulling needles from their arms." An ink tracing by Garry Robson of Numan's face on the single's sleeve would provide the design for the 1979 reissue cover of Tubeway Army's eponymously titled debut album.
A live version recorded 28 September 1979 at the Hammersmith Odeon, London (during 'The Touring Principle' concerts) and released on the B-side of the single "Complex" later that year. This arrangement differed from the earlier recordings, featuring a Roland CR-78 drum machine, violin, and synthesizer, along with guitar, bass, and conventional percussion (predominantly tom-toms). The track was included as a bonus track on various CD re-releases of The Pleasure Principle, as well as on an expanded version of Numan's live album Living Ornaments '79, where it appeared as the first of three songs utilising the same CR-78 preset drum pattern, the others being "Remember I Was Vapour" and "On Broadway". The Hammersmith recording was also released on the limited edition bonus disc issued with The Pleasure Principle 30th anniversary edition. This edition shows that it was originally supposed to have been released as part of a Live E.P. in January 1980.
Live version, recorded 31 May 1980 in Sydney, Australia (the last show of 'The Touring Principle') and released on the live album Engineers. This album was available exclusively and for a limited time on Numan's official website in early 2008.
Live version, recorded 6 November 1993, and released on the album Dream Corrosion (1994). This rendition resembles the original, rock-oriented version of the song rather than the slowed-down version from 'The Touring Principle'.
Live version, recorded on the Machine Music Tour at the Dome, Brighton on 3 June 2012, and released on Machine Music Live, June 2013.

References

1978 songs
Tubeway Army songs
Songs written by Gary Numan
Beggars Banquet Records singles
1978 singles